Visions of Gerard is a novel by American Beat writer Jack Kerouac. Written in the first two weeks of 1956, while staying with his sister Caroline in Rocky Mount, North Carolina, Kerouac's novel would not be published until 1963. It is the first volume in Kerouac's "Duluoz Legend".  Uniquely among Kerouac's novels, Visions of Gerard focuses on the scenes and sensations of childhood as evidenced in the tragically short yet happy life of his older brother, Gerard.  Kerouac paints a picture of the boy as a saint, who loves all creatures and teaches this doctrine to four-year-old Jack.  Set in Kerouac's hometown of Lowell, Massachusetts, it is a beautiful but unsettling exploration of the meaning and precariousness of existence.

Explanation of the novel's title
Throughout the novel, Jack explores perspective and interpretations of the world—existence, reality, illusion—and through the death of his older brother Gerard, Jack realizes the truth that has been passed on throughout history. The title is consistent with that of one of Kerouac's other character studies, Visions of Cody, which centers on his experiences with Neal Cassady. The novel inspired the title of Bob Dylan's song "Visions of Johanna" from his 1966 album Blonde on Blonde.

Character list
Kerouac often based his fictional characters on friends and family.

References

1963 American novels
Novels by Jack Kerouac
Beat novels
Novels set in Massachusetts
Lowell, Massachusetts